The Grand Prix Stakes is a Brisbane Racing Club Group 3 Thoroughbred horse race held under set weights with penalties conditions, for horses aged three years old, over a distance of 2200 metres held at Eagle Farm Racecourse, Brisbane, Australia during the Queensland Winter Racing Carnival. Total prize money is A$250,000.

History

In 2019, the Grand Prix Stakes was moved to its new summer home in December along with a prizemoney increase from $150,000 to $250,000.
This race was formerly held during the Brisbane winter racing carnival and was run twice during the 2019-2020 racing season, in May & December.

The following horses have completed the Grand Prix Stakes–Queensland Derby double:
Lefroy (1978), Double Century (1979), Kingston Town (1980), Mr. Cromwell (1981), Our Planet (1982), Librici (1984), Handy Proverb (1986), Hidden Rhythm (1989), Dorset Downs (1991), Air Seattle (1993), Half Hennessy (2003), Ice Chariot (2006) and Brambles (2012)

The race has had several changes in distance.

Venue
1971–2009 - Eagle Farm
2010–2016 - Doomben Racecourse
2017 - Eagle Farm
2018 - Doomben Racecourse
2019 onwards - Eagle Farm

Grade

1971–1978 - Principal Race
1979–2005 - Group 2
2006 onwards - Group 3

Distance

1971–1972 -  miles (~2400 metres)
1973–1974 – 2400 metres  
1975–1982 – 2200 metres
1983 – 2232 metres
1984–1989 – 2200 metres
1990 – 2244 metres
 1991 – 2225 metres
 1992–2001 – 2200 metres
 2002 – 2144 metres
 2003 – 2140 metres
 2004–2009 – 2100 metres
 2009–2014 – 2200 metres
 2015 – 2020 metres
 2016 onwards - 2200 metres

Winners

 2021 - Gypsy Goddess
 2020 - The Elanora
 2019 (Dec) - Chains Of Honour
 2019 (May) - Fun Fact
 2018 - Heavenly Thought
 2017 - Order Again
 2016 - Mackintosh
 2015 - Upham
 2014 - Vilanova
 2013 - Hawkspur
 2012 - Brambles
 2011 - Turnitup
 2010 - Kutchinsky
 2009 - Saint Minerva
 2008 - Bell Academy
 2007 - Sirmione
 2006 - Ice Chariot
 2005 - Spuruson
 2004 - Reclaim
 2003 - Half Hennessy
 2002 - Distinctly Secret
 2001 - Reenact
 2000 - Make Mine Magic
 1999 - Conair
 1998 - race not held
 1997 - race not held
 1996 - Faience
 1995 - Perfect Bound
 1994 - Sky Watch
 1993 - Air Seattle
 1992 - In The Event
 1991 - Dorset Downs
 1990 - Stargazer
 1989 - Hidden Rhythm
 1988 - race not held 
 1987 - Finezza Belle
 1986 - Handy Proverb
 1985 - Our Sophia
 1984 - Librici
 1983 - So Good
 1982 - Our Planet
 1981 - Mr. Cromwell
 1980 - Kingston Town
 1979 - Double Century
 1978 - Lefroy
 1977 - Surround
 1976 - Balmerino
 1975 - Lord Randolph
 1974 - Asgard
 1973 - Mighty Keys
 1972 - Latin Knight
 1971 - Mode

See also
 List of Australian Group races
 Group races

External links
 2008 Grand Prix Stakes winner

References

Horse races in Australia
Flat horse races for three-year-olds
Sport in Brisbane